Surrender Of Divinity is a black metal act from Bangkok, Thailand. The group was formed in 1996, and released 2 full-length albums during the 2000s. Their 2006 album Manifest Blasphemy: The Abortion of the Immaculate Conception was reviewed by Metal Hammer.

In January 2014, the band's bassist/vocalist Samon "Avaejee" Traisattha, aged 36, was stabbed to death in his own home. It is reported that he was murdered by the band's own fan, "for tarnishing Satanism". Samong's wife has confirmed that said fan was indeed visiting their home and having a drink with her husband.

Discography

Studio albums
Oriental Hell Rhythmics (2001)
Manifest Blasphemy: The Abortion of the Immaculate Conception (2006)

EP 
Immolating the Son of the Whore (EP, 2003)

Demos 
Promo 97
Rehearsal Demo '98

Split releases 
Christbeheaders (2000)
Two Majesties: An Arrogant Alliance of Satan's Extreme Elite (with Impiety, 2004)
Unholy Black War (2006)
Sabbatical SiameseChristBeheading (with Sabbat, 2006)
Deathstrike from the Abyss (2008)
Surrender of Divinity / Lobotomy (split DVD/video, 2013)
Angelslaying Christbeheading Black Fucking Metal (2013)

Compilation appearance 
Goatwrath Incarnation (2007)

References

Black metal musical groups
Musical groups established in 1996
Thai heavy metal musical groups
Musical groups from Bangkok